The 1977–78 NBA season was the 76ers 29th season in the NBA and 15th season in Philadelphia. The team finished the regular season with a record of 55–27. Head coach Gene Shue was replaced only 6 games into the season, by former Sixers player Billy Cunningham, who was only 34 years old at the time he replaced Shue. In the playoffs, the Sixers would sweep the New York Knicks, but lose in the Eastern Conference Finals to the Washington Bullets, a team with 11 fewer wins, 4 games to 2.

Following the season, George McGinnis was traded to the Denver Nuggets for Bobby Jones and World B. Free was dealt to the San Diego Clippers for a 1984 first round draft pick which would become Charles Barkley.

Offseason

Draft picks

Roster

Regular season

Season standings

z – clinched division title
y – clinched division title
x – clinched playoff spot

Record vs. opponents

Playoffs

|- align="center" bgcolor="#ccffcc"
| 1
| April 16
| New York
| W 130–90
| Steve Mix (19)
| Caldwell Jones (16)
| Steve Mix (7)
| Spectrum13,011
| 1–0
|- align="center" bgcolor="#ccffcc"
| 2
| April 18
| New York
| W 119–100
| Julius Erving (22)
| Caldwell Jones (11)
| Darryl Dawkins (6)
| Spectrum15,853
| 2–0
|- align="center" bgcolor="#ccffcc"
| 3
| April 20
| @ New York
| W 137–126
| McGinnis, Free (29)
| Julius Erving (10)
| Collins, Erving (7)
| Madison Square Garden18,697
| 3–0
|- align="center" bgcolor="#ccffcc"
| 4
| April 23
| @ New York
| W 112–107
| Doug Collins (24)
| Caldwell Jones (14)
| Collins, Erving (4)
| Madison Square Garden16,307
| 4–0
|-

|- align="center" bgcolor="#ffcccc"
| 1
| April 30
| Washington
| L 117–122 (OT)
| Julius Erving (25)
| George McGinnis (15)
| three players tied (5)
| Spectrum13,708
| 0–1
|- align="center" bgcolor="#ccffcc"
| 2
| May 3
| Washington
| W 110–104
| Doug Collins (28)
| Erving, Dawkins (11)
| Henry Bibby (9)
| Spectrum18,276
| 1–1
|- align="center" bgcolor="#ffcccc"
| 3
| May 5
| @ Washington
| L 108–123
| George McGinnis (16)
| Julius Erving (10)
| Henry Bibby (5)
| Capital Centre19,035
| 1–2
|- align="center" bgcolor="#ffcccc"
| 4
| May 7
| @ Washington
| L 105–121
| Julius Erving (24)
| Caldwell Jones (13)
| World B. Free (6)
| Capital Centre19,035
| 1–3
|- align="center" bgcolor="#ccffcc"
| 5
| May 10
| Washington
| W 107–94
| Collins, Erving (24)
| Caldwell Jones (15)
| Henry Bibby (10)
| Spectrum18,276
| 2–3
|- align="center" bgcolor="#ffcccc"
| 6
| May 12
| @ Washington
| L 99–101
| Doug Collins (33)
| Erving, McGinnis (8)
| Henry Bibby (5)
| Capital Centre19,035
| 2–4
|-

Awards and records
Julius Erving, All-NBA First Team

References

Philadelphia 76ers seasons
Philadelphia
Philadel
Philadel